Michel Antoine Garoutte anglicized as: Michael Antoine Garoutte ( 12th of April, 1750 – 29th of April, 1829 ) was a member of the first nobility of Provence in the Kingdom of France. He was a Pirate and Privateer in the early war for American Independence and ascended to the rank of Lieutenant in the first American Continental Navy.

He was the first owner of the La Fayette Tavern in Pleasant Mills, New Jersey, United States.

He belonged to a very old Provençal family of the nobility. He and his sister the Lady Marie Magdeleine Garoutte-Lascour and her family were French Revolutionaries as they were among the first French nobles to reform the French government in the French Revolution. Michel Antoine Garoutte's sister married the Baron of Signes, Kingdom of France César Antoine Espinassy-Venel.

Garoutte's favored nephew was Antoine Joseph Marie d'Espinassy who ascended to the rank of Army General in the French Revolutionary War and whose family was later responsible for the voted regicide of Louis-Auguste the 12th Duke of Berry who became the King of France as Louis XVI. The Garoutte-Espinassy family later married into the British Royal Family after meeting Ladies of the 6th Earl of Essex Arthur Algernon Capell the night before the Battle of Waterloo. The Lascour, Garoutte and Espinassy families were involved in the French Monarchy for several traceable earlier centuries as their direct traceable ancestors are all referred to as Masters of their own noble and Royal House in the French Tongue: nobles de race, meaning that each family was part of the Hereditary Peerage of France. In later centuries this Espinassy family were deeply involved in the French Revolution. The Garoutte-Espinassy family later had close ties with Napoléon Buonaparte and this ended in Napoléon's capture at the Palais de Μalmaison and his death on Saint Hélènè Island.

Michel Antoine Garoutte was one of the founding Catholics of the U.S. State Pennsylvania. The street named Garoutte in present-day Marseille, Republic of France is named after his family.

Additional research into historical documentation indicates the specific Metric System introduced to the French Republic by Napoléon Buonaparte from French Mathematicians specifically the Prince of Talleyrand, Charles-Maurice de Talleyrand-Périgord was devised with the contributions of earlier French Catholic Mathematicians and of the Garoutte-Espinassy family.

Michel Antoine Garoutte's maternal grand-father was the 6th Baron Henri de Lascour who was the first cousin and uncle of Louis Bourbon the King of France.

Michel Antoine Garoutte's niece the Lady Claire Charlotte Espinassy-Garoutte is academically famous for her written works namely History of Europe, History of France, How To Be a Lady and Nouvel Abrégé de l'Histoire de France
à L'usage des Jeunes Gens -- where the present-day nobility of numerous countries in the world as well as Universities still use these works to teach about the Nobility, European History and other topics.

The book named the Count of Monte Cristo by Alexandre Dumas published and circulated in 1844 was partly inspired by the life stories of people during and after the French Revolution in and around the naval and shipping district called Marseille. Dumas partly based his works from stories most likely circulating about the Espinassy families in Marseille and Signes in the Kingdom of France and later the Republic of France and Restoration of the Bourbons to France.

Early life
Garoutte was born on the 12th of April in 1750 in the Castle Garoutte in Marseille, Kingdom of France to the Lady, Marie Anne Félicité Lascour and the Admiral of the Royal French Navy, Antoine Garoutte. He was baptized the following day at the oldest Catholic Parish of Marseille, Kingdom of France the Église Notre-Dame-des-Accoules Church. He was brought up in training and educated as a Catholic Priest, but at the age of 15 his older brother died in battle with no heirs and Garoutte exited seminary and went to Military School and later Officers School in Paris.

Garoutte went to some of the same schools as his friend Marie-Joseph Paul Yves Roch Gilbert du Motier, the Marquis de LaFayette whose great grand-father was the Baron of Vissac, Charles Motier of Champetierès. Garoutte spent many months living in the Castle de la Jaconnière in Signes, Kingdom of France with the d'Espinassy Family after the death of his older brother.

After being pardoned in the King Louis XVI court for dueling he sailed from Marseille, Kingdom of France commanding two ships to the New York Colony and fought in the War for American Independence.

Military service
Garoutte was in the Battle of Chestnut Neck where the British burned down his ships in the Mullica River, New Jersey Colony. His Privateer activities involved overtaking British Merchant vessels and British Navy Vessels, taking the seized goods to Little Egg Harbor where the goods would be sent across the river through the Delaware and to Valley Forge to supply General George Washington's military forces. He also secured artillery for the Patriot military forces.

Garoutte later served on the brig-of-war Enterprise and sloop-of-war Racehorse as a naval officer in the American Continental Navy.

Shortly after the Battle of Chestnut Neck Garoutte went to retrieve his friend who was hiding in an Inn and he was ambushed by 7 Hessians. The Hessians stabbed Garoutte in his side with a bayonet and blunted his head leaving him for dead on the dirt road. He was found and assisted by John Smith a Quaker and Innkeeper who was secretly aiding the American Revolutionaries. Michel's life was saved and he married John Smith's daughter The Quakeress, Sophia Smith.

Return to France
Garoutte returned to the Kingdom of France arriving in 1787 where he was given gifts by the King Louis XVI and the Queen Marie Antoinette and again in January 1793 where his nephew was a member of the Council that decided Louis XVI's fate in the Trial of Louis XVI.

On his return to the Kingdom of France in 1787 his sister wrote the following letter:

La Fayette Tavern
Garoutte started a Tavern in Pleasant Mills, New Jersey and named it The La Fayette Tavern undoubtedly after his childhood friend and school fellow the Marquis de La Fayette. Batsto-Pleasant Mills, New Jersey was a manufacturer of guns, cannons and cannonballs for use with the military forces for American Independence.

Garoutte's Tavern saw patrons the Corsican King of Spain Joseph Bonaparte and the Marquis de LaFayette among others. His tavern was well known in the day and was regarded as one of the best in New Jersey. Ebenezer Tucker was said to have complemented Garoutte on his Most pleasant inn.

Death
Garoutte died on the 29th of April in 1829 at the age of 79 on the road in Pemberton, New Jersey determined to make his way back to France. He was buried in Pleasant Mills.

Garoutte mentioned in his journal that he was angry at John Sevier, Junior for stealing his daughter Sophia Garoutte from him and he "lost hope of ever seeing her again". He left the house of Governor John Sevier after Sevier took Garoutte's silver coins.

After he left he wrote the following entry in his journal:

Garoutte then decided to sail back to France but he never made it.

References

French privateers
Continental Navy officers
1750 births
French people of the American Revolution
French Revolution
French emigrants to the United States
1829 deaths